This is a shortened version of the sixth chapter of the ICD-9: Diseases of the Nervous System and Sense Organs. It covers ICD codes 320 to 389. The full chapter can be found on pages 215 to 258 of Volume 1, which contains all (sub)categories of the ICD-9. Volume 2 is an alphabetical index of Volume 1. Both volumes can be downloaded for free from the website of the World Health Organization.

In the ICD-9 system, a disease may have a cause listed in one chapter, and its manifestations listed in another. For example, Tuberculous meningitis is caused by a bacterial infection, and is therefore listed in Chapter 1, Infectious and parasitic diseases. However, as it results in a disorder of the nervous system, it is also listed in this chapter. An asterisk (*) means that a disease has an underlying cause which can be found elsewhere in the ICD. A code referring to such an underlying cause may be right next to the name, in parenthesis, and marked with a dagger symbol of the Times New Roman font (†).

Inflammatory diseases of the central nervous system (320–326)
  Bacterial meningitis
  Haemophilus meningitis
  Pneumococcal meningitis
  Streptococcal meningitis
  Staphylococcal meningitis
 * Tuberculous meningitis (†)
 * Meningococcal meningitis (†)
 * Meningitis in other bacterial diseases classified elsewhere
  Meningitis due to other specified bacteria
  Meningitis due to unspecified bacterium
 * Meningitis due to other organisms
 * Fungal meningitis (110–118†)
 * Meningitis due to Coxsackie virus (†)
 * Meningitis due to ECHO virus (†)
 * Meningitis due to herpes zoster virus (†)
 * Meningitis due to herpes simplex virus (†)
 * Meningitis due to mumps virus (†)
 * Meningitis due to lymphocytic choriomeningitis virus (†)
 * Meningitis due to other and unspecified viruses
 * Other
  Meningitis of unspecified cause
  Nonpyogenic meningitis
  Eosinophilic meningitis
  Chronic meningitis
  Meningitis, unspecified
  Encephalitis, myelitis and encephalomyelitis
 * Kuru (†)
 * Subacute sclerosing panencephalitis (†)
 * Poliomyelitis (045.–†)
 * Arthropod-borne viral encephalitis (062-064†)
 * Other encephalitis due to infection
  Encephalitis following immunization procedures
 * Postinfectious encephalitis
 * Toxic encephalitis
  Other
  Unspecified cause
  Intracranial and intraspinal abscess
  Intracranial abscess
  Intraspinal abscess
  Of unspecified site
  Phlebitis and thrombophlebitis of intracranial venous sinuses
  Late effects of intracranial abscess or pyogenic infection

Hereditary and Degenerative diseases of the central nervous system (330–337)
  Cerebral degenerations usually manifest in childhood
  Leucodystrophy
  Cerebral lipidoses
 * Cerebral degeneration in generalized lipidoses (†)
 * Cerebral degeneration of childhood in other diseases classified elsewhere
  Other cerebral degenerations in childhood
  Unspecified
  Other cerebral degenerations
  Alzheimer's disease
  Pick's disease
  Senile degeneration of brain
  Communicating hydrocephalus
  Obstructive hydrocephalus
 * Jakob-Creutzfeldt disease (†)
 * Progressive multifocal leucoencephalopathy (†)
 * Cerebral degeneration in other diseases classified elsewhere
  Other cerebral degeneration
  Unspecified
  Parkinson's disease
  Paralysis agitans
  Secondary Parkinsonism
  Other extrapyramidal disease and abnormal movement disorders
  Other degenerative diseases of the basal ganglia
  Essential and other specified forms of tremor
  Myoclonus
  Tics of organic origin
  Huntington's chorea
  Other choreas
  Idiopathic torsion dystonia
  Symptomatic torsion dystonia
  Fragments of torsion dystonia
  Other and unspecified
  Spinocerebellar disease
  Friedreich's ataxia
  Hereditary spastic paraplegia
  Primary cerebellar degeneration
  Other cerebellar ataxia
 * Cerebellar ataxia in diseases classified elsewhere
  Other
  Unspecified
  Anterior horn cell disease
  Werdnig-Hoffmann disease
  Spinal muscular atrophy
  Motor neurone disease
  Other
  Unspecified
  Other diseases of spinal cord
  Syringomyelia and syringobulbia
  Vascular myelopathies
 * Subacute combined degeneration of spinal cord (†)
 * Myelopathy in other diseases classified elsewhere
  Other myelopathy
  Unspecified diseases of spinal cord
  Disorders of the autonomic nervous system
  Idiopathic peripheral autonomic neuropathy
 * Peripheral autonomic neuropathy in disorders classified elsewhere
  Unspecified

Other disorders of the central nervous system (340–349)
  Multiple sclerosis
  Other demyelinating diseases of central nervous system
  Neuromyelitis optica
  Schilder's disease
  Other
  Unspecified
  Hemiplegia
  Flaccid hemiplegia
  Spastic hemiplegia
  Unspecified
  Infantile cerebral palsy
  Diplegic
  Hemiplegic
  Quadriplegic
  Monoplegic
  Infantile hemiplegia
  Other
  Unspecified
  Other paralytic syndromes
  Quadriplegia
  Paraplegia
  Diplegia of upper limbs
  Monoplegia of lower limb
  Monoplegia of upper limb
  Unspecified monoplegia
  Cauda equina syndrome
  Other
  Unspecified
  Epilepsy
  Generalized nonconvulsive epilepsy
  Generalized convulsive epilepsy
  Petit mal status
  Grand mal status
  Partial epilepsy, with impairment of consciousness
  Partial epilepsy, without mention of impairment of consciousness
  Infantile spasms
  Epilepsia partialis continua
  Other
  Unspecified
  Migraine
  Classical migraine
  Common migraine
  Variants of migraine
  Other
  Unspecified
  Cataplexy and narcolepsy
  Other conditions of brain
  Cerebral cysts
  Anoxic brain damage
  Benign intracranial hypertension
  Encephalopathy, unspecified
  Compression of brain
  Cerebral oedema
  Other
  Unspecified
  Other and unspecified disorders of the nervous system
  Reaction to spinal or lumbar puncture
  Nervous system complications from surgically implanted device
  Disorders of meninges, not elsewhere classified
  Other
  Unspecified

Disorders of the peripheral nervous system (350–359)
  Trigeminal nerve disorders
 * Post-herpetic trigeminal neuralgia (†)
  Other trigeminal neuralgia
  Atypical face pain
  Other
  Unspecified
  Facial nerve disorders
  Bell's palsy
  Geniculate ganglionitis
  Other
  Unspecified
  Disorders of other cranial nerves
  Disorders of olfactory [1st] nerve
  Glossopharyngeal neuralgia
  Other disorders of glossopharyngeal [9th] nerve
  Disorders of pneumogastric [10th] nerve
  Disorders of accessory [11th] nerve
  Disorders of hypoglossal [12th] nerve
  Multiple cranial nerve palsies
  Unspecified
  Nerve root and plexus disorders
  Brachial plexus lesions
  Lumbosacral plexus lesions
  Cervical root lesions, not elsewhere classified
  Thoracic root lesions, not elsewhere classified
  Lumbosacral root lesions, not elsewhere classified
  Neuralgic amyotrophy
  Phantom limb syndrome
  Other
  Unspecified
  Mononeuritis of upper limb and mononeuritis multiplex
  Carpal tunnel syndrome
  Other lesion of median nerve
  Lesion of ulnar nerve
  Lesion of radial nerve
  Causalgia
  Mononeuritis multiplex
  Other
  Unspecified
  Mononeuritis of lower limb
  Lesion of sciatic nerve
  Meralgia paraesthetica
  Lesion of femoral nerve
  Lesion of lateral popliteal nerve
  Lesion of medial popliteal nerve
  Tarsal tunnel syndrome
  Lesion of plantar nerve
  Other
  Unspecified mononeuritis of lower limb
  Mononeuritis of unspecified site
  Hereditary and idiopathic peripheral neuropathy
  Hereditary peripheral neuropathy
  Peroneal muscular atrophy
  Hereditary sensory neuropathy
  Refsum's disease
  Idiopathic progressive polyneuropathy
  Other
  Unspecified
  Inflammatory and toxic neuropathy
  Acute infective polyneuritis
 * Polyneuropathy in collagen vascular disease
 * Polyneuropathy in diabetes (†)
 * Polyneuropathy in malignant disease (140–208†)
 * Polyneuropathy in other diseases classified elsewhere
  Alcoholic polyneuropathy
  Polyneuropathy due to drugs
  Polyneuropathy due to other toxic agents
  Other
  Unspecified
  Myoneural disorders
  Myasthenia gravis
 * Myasthenic syndromes in diseases classified elsewhere
  Toxic myoneural disorders
  Other
  Unspecified
  Muscular dystrophies and other myopathies
  Congenital hereditary muscular dystrophy
  Hereditary progressive muscular dystrophy
  Myotonic disorders
  Familial periodic paralysis
  Toxic myopathy
 * Endocrine myopathy
 * Symptomatic inflammatory myopathy
  Other
  Unspecified

Disorders of the eye and adnexa (360–379)
  Disorders of the globe
  Purulent endophthalmitis
  Other endophthalmitis
  Degenerative disorders of globe
  Hypotony of eye
  Degenerated conditions of globe
  Retained (old) intraocular foreign body, magnetic
  Retained (old) intraocular foreign body, nonmagnetic
  Other disorders of globe
  Unspecified
  Retinal detachments and defects
  Retinal detachment with retinal defect
  Retinoschisis and retinal cysts
  Serous retinal detachment
  Retinal defects without detachment
  Other forms of retinal detachment
  Unspecified
  Other retinal disorders
 * Diabetic retinopathy (†)
  Other background retinopathy and retinal vascular changes
  Other proliferative retinopathy
  Retinal vascular occlusion
  Separation of retinal layers
  Degeneration of macula and posterior pole
  Peripheral retinal degenerations
  Hereditary retinal dystrophies
  Other retinal disorders
  Unspecified
  Chorioretinal inflammations and scars and other disorders of choroid
  Focal chorioretinitis and focal retinochoroiditis
  Disseminated chorioretinitis and disseminated retinochoroiditis
  Other and unspecified forms of chorioretinitis and retinochoroiditis
  Chorioretinal scars
  Choroidal degenerations
  Choroidal haemorrhage and rupture
  Choroidal detachment
  Other disorders of choroid
  Unspecified
  Disorders of iris and ciliary body
  Acute and subacute iridocyclitis
  Chronic iridocyclitis
  Certain types of iridocyclitis
  Unspecified iridocyclitis
  Vascular disorders of iris and ciliary body
  Degenerations of iris and ciliary body
  Cysts of iris, ciliary body and anterior chamber
  Adhesions and disruptions of iris and ciliary body
  Other disorders of iris and ciliary body
  Unspecified
  Glaucoma
  Borderline glaucoma
  Open-angle glaucoma
  Primary angle-closure glaucoma
  Corticosteroid-induced glaucoma
  Glaucoma associated with congenital anomalies, with dystrophies and with systemic syndromes
  Glaucoma associated with disorders of the lens
  Glaucoma associated with other ocular disorders
  Other glaucoma
  Unspecified
  Cataract
  Infantile, juvenile and presenile cataract
  Senile cataract
  Traumatic cataract
  Cataract secondary to ocular disorders
  Cataract associated with other disorders
  After-cataract
  Other cataract
  Unspecified
  Disorders of refraction and accommodation
  Hypermetropia
  Myopia
  Astigmatism
  Anisometropia and aniseikonia
  Presbyopia
  Disorders of accommodation
  Other
  Unspecified
  Visual disturbances
  Amblyopia ex anopsia
  Subjective visual disturbances
  Diplopia
  Other disorders of binocular vision
  Visual field defects
  Colour vision deficiencies
  Night blindness
  Other visual disturbances
  Unspecified
  Blindness and low vision
  Blindness, both eyes
  Blindness, one eye, low vision other eye
  Low vision, both eyes
  Unqualified visual loss, both eyes
  Legal blindness, as defined in U.S.A.
  Blindness, one eye
  Low vision, one eye
  Unqualified visual loss, one eye
  Unspecified visual loss
  Keratitis
  Corneal ulcer
 * Dendritic keratitis (†)
  Other superficial keratitis without conjunctivitis
  Certain types of keratoconjunctivitis
  Other and unspecified keratoconjunctivitis
  Interstitial and deep keratitis
  Corneal neovascularization
  Other forms of keratitis
  Unspecified
  Corneal opacity and other disorders of cornea
  Corneal scars and opacities
  Corneal pigmentations and deposits
  Corneal oedema
  Changes of corneal membranes
  Corneal degenerations
  Hereditary corneal dystrophies
  Keratoconus
  Other corneal deformities
  Other corneal disorders
  Unspecified
  Disorders of conjunctiva
  Acute conjunctivitis
  Chronic conjunctivitis
  Blepharoconjunctivitis
  Other and unspecified conjunctivitis
  Pterygium
  Conjunctival degenerations and deposits
  Conjunctival scars
  Conjunctival vascular disorders and cysts
  Other disorders of conjunctiva
  Unspecified
  Inflammation of eyelids
  Blepharitis
  Chalazion
  Noninfectious dermatoses of eyelid
 * Infective dermatitis of eyelid of types resulting in deformity
 * Other infective dermatitis of eyelid
 * Parasitic infestation of eyelid
  Other
  Unspecified
  Other disorders of eyelids
  Entropion and trichiasis of eyelid
  Ectropion
  Lagophthalmos
  Ptosis of eyelid
  Other disorders affecting eyelid function
  Degenerative disorders of eyelids and periocular area
  Other disorders of eyelid
  Unspecified
  Disorders of lacrimal system
  Dacryoadenitis
  Other disorders of lacrimal gland
  Epiphora
  Acute and unspecified inflammation of lacrimal passages
  Chronic inflammation of lacrimal passages
  Stenosis and insufficiency of lacrimal passages
  Other changes of lacrimal passages
  Other disorders of lacrimal system
  Unspecified
  Disorders of the orbit
  Acute inflammation of orbit
  Chronic inflammatory disorders of orbit
 * Endocrine exophthalmos
  Other exophthalmic conditions
  Deformity of orbit
  Enophthalmos
  Retained (old) foreign body following penetrating wound of orbit
  Other disorders of orbit
  Unspecified
  Disorders of optic nerve and visual pathways
  Papilloedema
  Optic atrophy
  Other disorders of optic disc
  Optic neuritis
  Other disorders of optic nerve
  Disorders of optic chiasm
  Disorders of other visual pathways
  Disorders of visual cortex
  Unspecified
  Strabismus and other disorders of binocular eye movements
  Convergent concomitant strabismus
  Divergent concomitant strabismus
  Intermittent heterotropia
  Other and unspecified heterotropia
  Heterophoria
  Paralytic strabismus
  Mechanical strabismus
  Other strabismus
  Other disorders of binocular eye movements
  Unspecified
  Other disorders of eye
  Scleritis and episcleritis
  Other disorders of sclera
  Disorders of vitreous body
  Aphakia and other disorders of lens
  Anomalies of pupillary function
  Nystagmus and other irregular eye movements
  Other disorders of eye and adnexa
  Unspecified

Diseases of the ear and mastoid process (380–389)
  Disorders of external ear
  Perichondritis of pinna
  Infective otitis externa
  Other otitis externa
  Noninfective disorders of pinna
  Impacted cerumen
  Acquired stenosis of external ear canal
  Other disorders of external ear
  Unspecified
  Nonsuppurative otitis media and Eustachian tube disorders
  Acute nonsuppurative otitis media
  Chronic serous otitis media
  Chronic mucoid otitis media
  Other and unspecified chronic nonsuppurative otitis media
  Nonsuppurative otitis media, not specified as acute or chronic
  Eustachian salpingitis
  Obstruction of Eustachian tube
  Patulous Eustachian tube
  Other disorders of Eustachian tube
  Unspecified Eustachian tube disorder
  Suppurative and unspecified otitis media
  Acute suppurative otitis media
  Chronic tubotympanic suppurative otitis media
  Chronic atticoantral suppurative otitis media
  Unspecified chronic suppurative otitis media
  Unspecified suppurative otitis media
  Unspecified otitis media
  Mastoiditis and related conditions
  Acute mastoiditis
  Chronic mastoiditis
  Petrositis
  Complications following mastoidectomy
  Other
  Unspecified mastoiditis
  Other disorders of tympanic membrane
  Acute myringitis without mention of otitis media
  Chronic myringitis without mention of otitis media
  Perforation of tympanic membrane
  Other
  Unspecified
  Other disorders of middle ear and mastoid
  Tympanosclerosis
  Adhesive middle ear disease
  Other acquired abnormality of ear ossicles
  Cholesteatoma of middle ear and mastoid
  Other
  Unspecified
  Vertiginolls syndromes and other disorders of vestibular system
  Ménière's disease
  Other and unspecified peripheral vertigo
  Vertigo of central origin
  Labyrinthitis
  Labyrinthine fistula
  Labyrinthine dysfunction
  Other disorders of labyrinth
  Unspecified vertiginous syndromes and labyrinthine disorders
  Otosclerosis
  Otosclerosis involving oval window, nonobliterative
  Otosclerosis involving oval window, obliterative
  Cochlear otosclerosis
  Other
  Unspecified
  Other disorders of ear
  Degenerative and vascular disorders of ear
  Noise effects on inner ear
  Sudden hearing loss, unspecified
  Tinnitus
  Other abnormal auditory perception
  Disorders of acoustic nerve
  Otorrhoea
  Otalgia
  Other
  Unspecified
  Deafness
  Conductive deafness
  Sensorineural deafness
  Mixed conductive and sensorineural deafness
  Deaf mutism, not elsewhere classifiable
  Other specified forms of deafness
  Unspecified deafness

International Classification of Diseases